The Sun City Carnival Tour was the ninth headline concert tour by American country music singer Kenny Chesney, in supported of both his twelfth studio album Lucky Old Sun (2008) and his second greatest hits compilation Greatest Hits II (2009). The tour began on April 17, 2009, in Uncasville, Connecticut and ended on September 19 of that year in Indianapolis. This tour was the biggest country music tour for 2009 and the sixth overall in music.

Opening acts
Lady Antebellum
Miranda Lambert
Montgomery Gentry
Sugarland
Jake Owen
Uncle Kracker
Zac Brown Band

Set list
 Set list varies, not performed in same order every night, some songs not played at every show.
"She Thinks My Tractor's Sexy"
"Live Those Songs"
"Summertime"
"Beer in Mexico"
"Keg in the Closet"
"Out Last Night"
"Big Star"
"No Shoes, No Shirt, No Problems"
"I Go Back"
"Anything but Mine"
"Down the Road"
"Me and You"
"Old Blue Chair"
"Living in Fast Forward"
"Young
"Never Wanted Nothing More"
"Back Where I Come From" 
"How Forever Feels"
"Everybody Wants to Go to Heaven"
"When the Sun Goes Down"
"Don't Happen Twice"
 "Jack & Diane" 
Encore
"Don't Blink"
"Better as a Memory"
"Take It Easy" 
"Mary Jane's Last Dance" 
"The Joker" 
"With or Without You" 
"The Fireman" 
"Hurts So Good" 
"Blister in the Sun" 
"You Really Got Me" 
"Rocky Mountain Way" 
"That Lucky Old Sun"

Tour dates

Festivals and fairs
 This concert was a part of the Stagecoach Music Festival''.
 This concert was a part of the Apple River Country Splash Festival.
  This concert was a part of Summerfest.
 These concerts were part of the Cheyenne Frontier Days'''.

Notes
The Frisco, Texas concert was abandoned due to torrential rain and lighting fifty minutes into the show. It was made up on May 17, 2009.

References

2009 concert tours
Kenny Chesney concert tours